Gonzalo Cabrera is an Argentine professional footballer. He plays on the left wing and is also capable of being a striker. He also holds Iraqi citizenship.

Career
Cabrera was born in Buenos Aires, where he made his first football steps in the academy of Boca Juniors.

He began his senior career at Boca Juniors in 2007, but failed to make a league appearance during his four years at the club. During this time he also spent time on loan at Deportivo Cali, Doxa Katokopias and AEK Larnaca, making a combined total of 30 league appearances and scoring 4 goals.

In July 2011 he joined Godoy Cruz Antonio Tomba, making 32 league appearances. During this time he also spent time on loan at Once Caldas, making 38 league appearances and scoring 6 goals.

In 2015 he joined Defensa y Justicia, making 4 league appearances and scoring one goal. In July 2015 he joined Botoșani, making 37 league appearances and scoring 11 goals. Cabrera's spell at Botoșani didn't last long and in July 2016 he joined Al-Faisaly, making 15 league appearances and scoring 2 goals in two years. During this time he also spent time on loan at Johor Darul Ta'zim. Cabrera was an influential player for the Johor Darul Ta'zim in their first season, scoring 19 goals and contributing another five assists. In the 2017 Super League season, he played under an Argentine passport. However, in the following season, he signed for JDT as an Asian player with an Iraqi passport.

Honours
Johor Darul Ta'zim
 Malaysia Super League: 2017, 2018, 2019, 2020, 2021
 Malaysia Cup: 2017, 2019
 Malaysia Charity Shield: 2018, 2019, 2020, 2021

References

External links

1989 births
Living people
Footballers from Buenos Aires
Argentine footballers
Association football wingers
Association football forwards
Argentine expatriate footballers
Deportivo Cali footballers
Doxa Katokopias FC players
AEK Larnaca FC players
Godoy Cruz Antonio Tomba footballers
Once Caldas footballers
Defensa y Justicia footballers
FC Botoșani players
Argentine Primera División players
Categoría Primera A players
Cypriot First Division players
Liga I players
Expatriate footballers in Colombia
Argentine expatriate sportspeople in Colombia
Expatriate footballers in Cyprus
Expatriate footballers in Romania
Expatriate footballers in Saudi Arabia
Al-Faisaly FC players
Argentine expatriate sportspeople in Saudi Arabia
Saudi Professional League players
Argentine expatriate sportspeople in Romania
Argentine expatriate sportspeople in Cyprus
Naturalised citizens of Iraq
Argentine expatriate sportspeople in Malaysia
Expatriate footballers in Malaysia
Johor Darul Ta'zim F.C. players
Malaysia Super League players